Joan Croydon (May 15, 1908 – April 23, 1985) was an American stage actress.

Early years
Born as Vivian Giesen in Tarrytown, New York to a French mother and a father of German/French descent. She was trained as a dancer at  Isadora Duncan dance school. She was cast as a substitute lead nun in Max Reinhardt's The Miracle. She also had Broadway credits in the 1930s under her real name.

Career
She appeared in only one film, The Bad Seed, in which she reprised her stage role, Miss Fern. The character she played, a murderous child's suspicious teacher, is one described in the play's stage notes as "dowdy", "a spinster", and "middle aged", and is generally played by much older actresses. In any event, Croydon received a poor review for her film performance from the New York Times''' film critic, Bosley Crowther, who gave poor or mixed reviews to the entire cast in his review.

Croydon received rave reviews for playing the Mother in William Ball's production of Six Characters in Search of an Author. Croydon then became one of the founding members of The American Conservatory Theater (ACT) which originated in Pittsburgh and is now in San Francisco.

Croydon received a Clarence Derwent Award in 1957 for her performance as "Miss Connolly (Housekeeper)" in The Potting Shed.

Stage credits
 Major Barbara  as "Mrs. Baines" - from February 26, 1980 until March 30, 1980
 Compulsion as "Mrs. Straus" - from October 24, 1957 until February 22, 1958
 The Potting Shed as "Miss Connolly" - from January 29, 1957 until June 1, 1957
 The Bad Seed as "Miss Fern" - from December 8, 1954 until September 27, 1955
 The First Crocus'' as "Miss Engebretsen" - from January 2, 1942 until January 6, 1942

Family
Croydon's husband was Guy Spaull (1904–1980), an American actor of stage and television. They had one child, Malcolm Spaull, who, as of March 2009, is the Chair of the Rochester Institute of Technology (RIT)'s Graduate School of Film and Animation in Rochester, New York.

External links

References

1908 births
1985 deaths
20th-century American actresses
Actresses from New York City
American film actresses
American people of French descent
American people of German descent
American stage actresses
Clarence Derwent Award winners
People from Tarrytown, New York
Place of death missing